Haplogroup I-M438, also known as I2 (ISOGG 2019), is a human DNA Y-chromosome haplogroup, a subclade of Haplogroup I-M170. Haplogroup I-M438 originated some time around 26,000–31,000 BCE. It originated in Europe and developed into several main subgroups : I2-M438*, I2a-L460, I2b-L415 and I2c-L596. The haplogroup can be found all over Europe and reaches its maximum frequency in the Dinaric Alps (Balkans) via founder effect. Examples of basal I-M438* have been found in males from Crete and Sicily .

Origin & prehistoric presence

Haplogroup I2a was the most frequent Y-DNA among western European mesolithic hunter gatherers (WHG) belonging to Villabruna Cluster. A 2015 study found haplogroup I2a in 13,500 year old remains from the Azilian culture (from Grotte du Bichon, modern Switzerland). Subclades of I2a1 (I-P37.2), namely I-M423 and I-M26 have been found in remains of Western European Hunter-Gatherers dating from 10,000 to 8,000 years before present respectively.

In a 2015 study published in Nature, the remains of six individuals from Motala ascribed to the Kongemose culture were successfully analyzed. With regards to Y-DNA, two individuals were ascribed to haplogroup I2a1b, one individual was ascribed to haplogroup I2a1, and one individual was ascribed to haplogroup I2c.

Subclades of I-L460

I-P37.2
The I-P37.2+, also known as I2a1a (ISOGG 2019) (The subclade divergence for I-P37.2 occurred 10.7±4.8 kya. The age of YSTR variation for the P37.2 subclade is 8.0±4.0 kya. It is the predominant version of I2 in Eastern Europe. The I2a is further made up by sub-groups I-M26, I-M423, I-L1286, I-L880.

I-L158
Haplogroup I-M26 (or M26)  I2a1a1a (ISOGG 2019).

Haplogroup I-L158 (L158, L159.1/S169.1, M26) accounts for approximately 40% of all patrilines among the Sardinians. It is also found at low to moderate frequency among populations of the Pyrenees (9.5% in Bortzerriak, Navarra; 9.7% in Chazetania, Aragon; 8% in Val d'Aran, Catalunya; 2.9% in Alt Urgell, Catalunya; and 8.1% in Baixa Cerdanya, Catalunya) and Iberia, and it has been found in 1.6% of a sample of Albanians living in the Republic of North Macedonia and 1.2% (3/257) of a sample of Czechs. The age of YSTR variation for the M26 subclade has been calculated at 8.0±4.0 kya.

I-L178
I-L178 is very rare, but has been found in two persons from Germany and one from Poland. The age of YSTR variation for the M423 subclade is 8.8±3.6 kya.

I2a-L621

I2a1a2b-L621 is typical of the Slavic populations, being highest in Southeastern European regions of Bosnia-Herzegovina and South Croatia (>45%), in Bosniaks (43.53-52.17%), Croats (37.7-69.8%), and Serbs (36.6-42%), because of which is often called "Dinaric". It has the highest variance and also high concentration in Eastern Europe (Ukraine, Southeastern Poland, Belarus). According to YFull YTree it formed 11,400 YBP and had TMRCA 6,500 YBP, while its main subclades lineage is I-CTS10936 (6,500-5,600 YBP) > I-S19848 (5,600 YBP) > I-CTS4002 (5,600-5,100 YBP) > I-CTS10228 (5,100-3,400 YBP) > I-Y3120 (3,400-2,100 YBP) > I-Y18331 (2,100 YBP)  / I-Z17855 (2,100-1650 YBP) / I-Y4460 (2,100 YBP) / I-S17250 (2,100-1,850 YBP) > I-PH908 (1,850-1,700 YBP).

Older research considered that the high frequency of this subclade in the South Slavic-speaking populations to be the result of "pre-Slavic" paleolithic settlement in the region. Peričić et al. (2005) for instance place its expansion to have occurred "not earlier than the YD to Holocene transition and not later than the early Neolithic". However the prehistoric autochthonous origin of the haplogroup I2 in the Balkans is now considered as out of date, as already Battaglia et al. (2009) observed highest variance of the haplogroup in Ukraine, and Zupan et al. (2013) noted that it suggests it arrived with Slavic migration from the homeland which was in present-day Ukraine. The research by O.M. Utevska (2017) concluded that the haplogroup STR haplotypes have the highest diversity in Ukraine, with ancestral STR marker result "DYS448=20" comprising "Dnieper-Carpathian" cluster, while younger derived result "DYS448=19" comprising the "Balkan cluster" which is predominant among the South Slavs. This "Balkan cluster" also has the highest variance in Ukraine, which indicates that the very high frequency in the Western Balkan is because of a founder effect. Utevska calculated that the STR cluster divergence and its secondary expansion from the middle reaches of the Dnieper river or from Eastern Carpathians towards the Balkan peninsula happened approximately 2,860 ± 730 years ago, relating it to the times before Slavs, but much after the decline of the Cucuteni–Trypillia culture. However, STR-based calculations give overestimated dates, and more specifically, the "Balkan cluster" is represented by a single SNP, I-PH908, known as I2a1a2b1a1a1c in ISOGG phylogenetic tree (2019), and according to YFull YTree it formed and had TMRCA approximately 1,850-1,700 YBP (2nd-3rd century AD).

It is considered that I-L621 could have been present in the Cucuteni–Trypillia culture, but until now was mainly found G2a and non-I2-L621 clades, and another clade I2a1a1-CTS595 was present in the Baden culture of the Chalcolithic Carpathian Basin. Although it is dominant among the modern Slavic peoples on the territory of the former Balkan provinces of the Roman Empire, until now it was not found among the samples from the Roman period and is almost absent in contemporary population of Italy. It was found in the skeletal remains with artifacts, indicating leaders, of Hungarian conquerors of the Carpathian Basin from the 9th century, part of Western Eurasian-Slavic component of the Hungarians. According to Pamjav et al. (2019) and Fóthi et al. (2020), the distribution of ancestral subclades like of I-CTS10228 among contemporary carriers indicates a rapid expansion from Southeastern Poland, is mainly related to the Slavs and their medieval migration, and the "largest demographic explosion occurred in the Balkans". The earliest archeogenetic sample until now is Sungir 6 (~900 YBP) near Vladimir, Russia which belonged to the I-S17250 > I-Y5596 > I-Z16971 > I-Y5595 > I-A16681 subclade, as well I-CTS10228 and I-Y3120 subclades were found in two Viking samples from Sweden (VK53) and Ukraine (VK542) with predominantly Slavic ancestry of which the second belongs to Gleb Svyatoslavich (11th century).

I-M223
Haplogroup I-M223 aka I2a1b1 (ISOGG 2019), formerly I2a2a (ISOGG 2014). The age of YSTR variation for the I-M223 subclade has been variously estimated as 13.2±2.7 kya, 12.3±3.1 kya., 14.6 kya and 14.6±3.8 kya (Rootsi 2004). I-M223 has a peak in Germany and another in the northeast of Sweden, but also appears in Romania/Moldova, Russia, Greece, Italy and around the Black Sea. Haplogroup I-M223 has been found in over 4% of the population only in Germany, the Netherlands, Belgium, Denmark, Scotland, and England (excluding Cornwall) – also the southern tips of Sweden and Norway in Northwest Europe; the provinces of Normandy, Maine, Anjou, and Perche in northwestern France; the province of Provence in southeastern France; the regions of Tuscany, Umbria, and Latium in Italy; Moldavia and the area around Russia's Ryazan Oblast and Mordovia in Eastern Europe. Of historical note, both haplogroups I-M253 and I-M223 appear at a low frequency in the historical regions of Bithynia and Galatia in Turkey. Haplogroup I-M223 also occurs among approximately 1% of Sardinians.

I-M284
Haplogroup I2a1b1a1a (ISOGG 2019) or I-M284, has been found almost exclusively amongst the populations of the United Kingdom and Ireland suggesting that it may have arisen amongst the Ancient Britons, with a most recent common ancestor (MRCA) who lived about 3,100 years BP.  The presence of this subclade "provides some tentative evidence of ancient flow with eastern areas that could support the idea that the [late Celtic] La Tene culture was accompanied by some migration." 

Where it is found in those of predominately Irish descent, with Gaelic surnames, it may suggest an ancestor who arrived in Ireland during prehistory, from Celtic Britain. For example, I-M284 includes many males with the surnames McGuinness and McCartan, who have a single, historically-recorded male ancestor in the 6th century; thus it is unlikely to be the result of subsequent migration from Britain to Ireland. Some subclades of I-M284 that are atypical of Ireland are relatively common in continental Europe, which also supports a point of origin east of Ireland.

I-CTS10057
Continentals. Mother Haplogroup for group I-Z161 (Continental 1 and 2) and I-L701 group (Continental 3). Around 10.000 years old.

I-Z161
Haplogroup I2a1b1a2b (ISOGG 2019). Z161+ defines the I2 Continental clade 1 and 2. Its age is estimated around 7,000 years old. It is mainly found in North Europe, especially in Denmark, Germany, the Netherlands, and England. In Northwest Sicily it can also be found; this is believed to be due to remnants of a Norman settlement.

I-L701
Called Continental 3. Continental 3 has a wide distribution. Found in Central Europe from Germany, Austria to Poland, Romania and Ukraine, but also in lower frequencies in Greece, Italy, France, Spain, England, Ireland, and Armenia. It may have been disseminated in part by the Goths. It is nearly absent from Scandinavia and Scotland.

I-M436

Subclades list

Up-to-date phylogenetic trees listing subclades of I can be found at Y-Full and FamilyTreeDNA

•I2 M438/P215/PF3853/S31 (16638804 A->G)
• •I2a L460/PF3647/S238 (7879415 A->C)
• • •I2a1 P37.2/PF4004 (14491684 T->C)
• • • •I2a1a CTS595 (6874115 C->T)
• • • • •I2a1a1 M26/PF4056 (21865821 G->A)
• • • • • •I2a1a1a CTS8968/PF4036 (18584762 T->C)
• • • • • • •I2a1a1a1 L672/S327 (22228628 T->A)
• • • • • • • •I2a1a1a1a L160/PF4013/S184
• • • • • • •I2a1a1a2 CTS6027 (16620529 C->G)                        w. Europeans
• • • • • • •I2a1a1a3 Z27395 (16681589 A->G)
• • • • • • • •I2a1a1a3a Z27410 (18891640 T->G)
• • • • • • • • •I2a1a1a3a1 Z27430 (15383072 T->C)
• • • • • • • • • •I2a1a1a3a1a Z27446 (14420039 G->A)
• • • • • • • • • • •I2a1a1a3a1a1 Z27447 (17445510 A->G)
• • • • • • • • • • • •I2a1a1a3a1a1a Z27452 (7346620 C->T)                                 Sardinians
• • • • • • • • • • • •I2a1a1a3a1a1b Z27453 (22045753 C->A)
• • • • • • • • • • • • •I2a1a1a3a1a1b1 Z27456 (13885862 T->C)                          Sardinians
• • • • • •I2a1a1b Z27354 (7132292 T->C)                                                               
• • • • • • •I2a1a1b1 Z27400 (2833818 C->T)                                                         Sardinians
• • • • •I2a1a2 S21825 (19126655 G->A)
• • • • • •I2a1a2a L1286 (21778662 G->A)
• • • • • • •I2a1a2a1 L1287 (21970862 G->T)
• • • • • • • •I2a1a2a1a L233/S183 (14487362 G->A)
• • • • • • • • •I2a1a2a1a1 A417 (8846964 T->C)                                                    Brits
• • • • • • •I2a1a2a2 L880 (3436270 C->T)                                                       central Europeans
• • • • • •I2a1a2b L1294 (2887401 T->C)                                                                 French
• • • • •I2a1a3 S2699 (14434372 C->T)
• • • •I2a1b M423 (19096091 G->A)
• • • • •I2a1b1 L161.1/S185.1 (22513718 C->T)
• • • • • •I2a1b1a L1498/Y4008 (18668472 C->T)
• • • • • • •I2a1b1a1 FGC7218/Y5280 (21354226 G->A)                 Irish
• • • • • • •I2a1b1a2 FGC14448/Y5450 (7158983 A->G)                   Irish
• • • • • • •I2a1b1a3 FGC7108/S2640 (14107847 G->A)
• • • • • • • •I2a1b1a3a FGC7197/S7703 (17494645 G->C)
• • • • • • • • •I2a1b1a3a1 S7714 (21345894 T->A)
• • • • • • • • • •I2a1b1a3a1a S8889 (4310132 A->G)
• • • • • • • •I2a1b1a3b S2742 (19440521 A->G)
• • • • • • • •I2a1b1a3c FGC7173/Y3729 (8472670 A->T)
• • • • • • • • •I2a1b1a3c1 FGC7156/Y4665 (2685333 T->C)
• • • • • • • • • •I2a1b1a3c1a FGC7218/Y5280 (21354226 G->A)
• • • • • • • • •I2a1b1a3c2 FGC14453/Y5456 (16637771 A->G)
• • • • • • •I2a1b1a4 A1150 (15543414 A->T)
• • • • • •I2a1b1b PF4135 (18981938 G->A)                                                               Brits
• • • • • •I2a1b1c CTS8849.2 (18236845 A->G)
• • • • • •I2a1b1d PF6316.2 (18181850 T->G)
• • • • •I2a1b2 L621/S392 (18760081 G->A)
• • • • • •I2a1b2a CTS4002 (15328797 C->A)
• • • • • • •I2a1b2a1 CTS10228 (9334357 A->C)
• • • • • • • •I2a1b2a1a S17250/YP204 (15531354 G->A)
• • • • • • • • •I2a1b2a1a1 Z16971 (6676628 G->C)                          Slovenians, Germans, Ukrainians
• • • • • • • • •I2a1b2a1a2 Y3548 (14856842 A->G)                                    Sardinians
• • • • • • • • • •I2a1b2a1a2a Y4882 (21135222 G->A)                                           Poles
• • • • • • • • •I2a1b2a1a3 A356/Z16983 (17558968 T->C)
• • • • • • • • • •I2a1b2a1a3a Y6651 (23792119 A->G)                               Czechs
• • • • • • • •I2a1b2a1b Y4460 (9028830 G->A)
• • • • • • • • •I2a1b2a1b1 Y3118 (23548545 T->C)
• • • • • • • • • •I2a1b2a1b1a CTS5579/S5054 (16378157 G->T)          Finns
• • • • • • • •I2a1b2a1b V19.2 (2189,200 T->C) 
• • • • • • • •I2a1b2a1c P61.2 (14482194 G->A) 
• • •I2a2 M436/P214/PF3856/S33 (18747493 G->C)
• • • •I2a2a M223 (21717307 G->A)
• • • • •I2a2a1 CTS616 (6906332 G->C)
• • • • • •I2a2a1a Y3721 (7982615 C->T)
• • • • • • •I2a2a1a1 M284 (22750461..22750464 ACAA->del)
• • • • • • • •I2a2a1a1a L1195 (18865320 G->A)
• • • • • • • • •I2a2a1a1a1 L126/S165 (14901633 C->T)
• • • • • • • • • •I2a2a1a1a1a FGC20048/S7753/Y4171 (17603051 G->T)
• • • • • • • • • • •I2a2a1a1a1a1 FGC20065/Y4751 (18635722 A->G)    
• • • • • • • • • • • •I2a2a1a1a1a1a Y4750 (23059262 C->G)                                       
• • • • • • • • • • • • •I2a2a1a1a1a1a1 FGC20062/Y4753 (16910733 G->T)   Irish, Scots
• • • • • • • • • • • • •I2a2a1a1a1a1a2 Y8599                      Irish
• • • • • • • • • •I2a2a1a1a1b Y7190 (7987909 C->T)                                           Scots
• • • • • • • • • •I2a2a1a1a1c F3878.2 (8752246 G->A) 
• • • • • • • • •I2a2a1a1a2 L1193 (9448484 C->A)
• • • • • • • • • •I2a2a1a1a2a CTS4922 (15903939 T->C)
• • • • • • • • • • •I2a2a1a1a2a1 FGC14237/Y5996 (8292320 G->T)          Irish
• • • • • • • • • •I2a2a1a1a2b CTS3792/S2380  (15183633 C->T)
• • • • • • •I2a2a1a2 Z2057 (4770006 T->C) 
• • • • • • • •I2a2a1a2a L1229 (14937828 C->A) 
• • • • • • • • •I2a2a1a2a1 Y3681 (22519059 T->C)
• • • • • • • • • •I2a2a1a2a1a Z2058 (5317533 T->C) 
• • • • • • • • • • •I2a2a1a2a1a1 Z2054 (2980725 C->T)
• • • • • • • • • • • •I2a2a1a2a1a1a BY524/Y9443 (6371561 A->G)
• • • • • • • • • • • • •I2a2a1a2a1a1a1 L812/S391 (14850035 G->A)                         
• • • • • • • • • • • • • •I2a2a1a2a1a1a1a Y5308 (16820196 G->A)  
• • • • • • • • • • • • •I2a2a1a2a1a1a2 Y10648 (8267867 C->G) 
• • • • • • • • • • • •I2a2a1a2a1a1b Y7244 (8271590 C->T)                                                Germans
• • • • • • • • • • • • •I2a2a1a2a1a1b1 P53.3 (14491649 T->C)
• • • • • • • • • • • • •I2a2a1a2a1a1b2 Y7243 (2911078 G->A)
• • • • • • • • • • • •I2a2a1a2a1a1c FGC15106/Y4334 (7845669 G->T)                     
• • • • • • • • • • • • •I2a2a1a2a1a1c1 FGC15128/Y4714 (15945966 G->C)                   Irish
• • • • • • • • • • • • •I2a2a1a2a1a1c2 Y4760 (15025945 A->T)                                                Brits, Germans
• • • • • • • • • • • •I2a2a1a2a1a1d BY138 (2809424 A->T)                                               Mexicans, English
• • • • • • • • •I2a2a1a2a2 S18331 (16449714 C->T)                                                              Brits
• • • • • • • • • •I2a2a1a2a2a L1230 (3436442 G->A)                                                     Brits
• • • • • • • •I2a2a1a2b Y7240 (2688254 T->G)                                                                           English
• • • • • •I2a2a1b CTS10057 (19232160 C->T)
• • • • • • •I2a2a1b1 L702 (7629205 C->T)
• • • • • • • •I2a2a1b1a P78 (6740387 G->A)
• • • • • • • • •I2a2a1b1a1 S25733 (23595728 C->T)
• • • • • • • • • •I2a2a1b1a1a A427 (23281929 G->T)
• • • • • • • • • • •I2a2a1b1a1a1 S23612 (21826246 C->T)                                      Brits, Italians, Germans
• • • • • • • • • • • •I2a2a1b1a1a1a Y5360 (23185624 G->T)  
• • • • • • • • • • • •I2a2a1b1a1a1b S10702 (7822881 T->C)
• • • • • • • • • • •I2a2a1b1a1a2 Y5369 (23185624 G->T)                                 Brits
• • • • • • • • •I2a2a1b1a2 Y7219 (8447173 C->A)
• • • • • • • • • •I2a2a1b1a2a Y7214 (4901002 C->A)                                           Dutch
• • • • • • • • • •I2a2a1b1a2b Y8945 (4567154 G->A)                                         
• • • • • • • •I2a2a1b1b L699 (2663920 A->G)
• • • • • • • • •I2a2a1b1b1 L704 (17595966 C->A)
• • • • • • • • • •I2a2a1b1b1a S12195 (9105096 C->T)
• • • • • • • • • • •I2a2a1b1b1a1 Y6973 (8430276 A->G)
• • • • • • • • •I2a2a1b1b2 Z26416 (18851267 G->A)                                                    Sardinians
• • • • • • • • •I2a2a1b1b3 PF6901 (17558585 C->G)                                                    Sardinians
• • • • • • • •I2a2a1b1c PF6896 (8904322 C->T)                                             Brits, French
• • • • • • •I2a2a1b2 Z161 (2696497 C->G)
• • • • • • • •I2a2a1b2a L801/S390 (21763755 A->C)
• • • • • • • • • •I2a2a1b2a1 CTS1977 (14140273 G->A)
• • • • • • • • • • •I2a2a1b2a1a Y5282 (7982615 C->T)
• • • • • • • • • • • •I2a2a1b2a1a1 S8522 (3162610 T->C)
• • • • • • • • • • • • •I2a2a1b2a1a1a P95 (14869706 G->T)                                        Poles, n.w. Europeans
• • • • • • • • • • • •I2a2a1b2a1a2 CTS1858 (14098206 G->T)
• • • • • • • • • • • • •I2a2a1b2a1a2a CTS10148 (19291083 A->T)                            African Americans
• • • • • • • • • • •I2a2a1b2a1b Y7152 (5852771 C->T)
• • • • • • • • • • •I2a2a1b2a1c BY526 or Y8935
• • • • • • • • • •I2a2a1b2a2 CTS6433 (16889964 T->C)
• • • • • • • • • • •I2a2a1b2a2a S2364 (23052606 A->G)
• • • • • • • • • • • •I2a2a1b2a2a1 FGC3618/S2361 (17355245 A->G)
• • • • • • • • • • • • •I2a2a1b2a2a1a Z78 (9154908 T->C)
• • • • • • • • • • • • • •I2a2a1b2a2a1a1 CTS8584
• • • • • • • • • • • • • • •I2a2a1b2a2a1a1a Z185 (22929384 T->C)
• • • • • • • • • • • • • • • •I2a2a1b2a1b1a1a1 Z180 (22065434 A->G)
• • • • • • • • • • • • • • • • •I2a2a1b2a1b1a1a1a L1198 (18405788 C->T))
• • • • • • • • • • • • • • • • • •I2a2a1b2a1b1a1a1a1 Z190 (17473966 G->T)
• • • • • • • • • • • • • • • • • • •I2a2a1b2a1b1a1a1a1a S434/Z79 (17147721 G->A)          English
• • • • • • • • • • • • • • • • • • • •I2a2a1b2a1b1a1a1a1a1 Y5729 (14394460 C->T)           English
• • • • • • • • • • • • • • • • • • • •I2a2a1b2a1b1a1a1a1a2 Y7682 (not yet reported)
• • • • • • • • • • • • • • • • • •I2a2a1b2a1b1a1a1a1b Y7280 (17305030 T->G)   
• • • • • • • • • • • • • • • • •I2a2a1b2a1b1a1a1a2 FGC3617/S2368/Z166 (14010863 G->T)
• • • • • • • • • • • • • • • • •I2a2a1b2a1b1a1a1a3 P195.2 (22665262 A->G)                  Brits
• • • • • • • • • • • • • • • •I2a2a1b2a1b1a1a1b Y5748 (14106278 C->T)
• • • • • • • • • • • • • • • • •I2a2a1b2a1b1a1a1b1 Y7272 (19264274 G->A)
• • • • • • • • • • • • • • • •I2a2a1b2a1b1a1a1c Y7273 (16449864 A>G)
• • • • • • • • • • • • •I2a2a1b2a1b1a2 Y9161 (9154908 T->C) 
• • • • • • • • • • • •I2a2a1b2a1b1b Y4925/ZS20 (23977120 A->C) 
• • • • • • • • • • • • •I2a2a1b2a1b1b1 CTS661/L1272 (6931960 G->A)
• • • • • • • • • • • • • •I2a2a1b2a1b1b1a Y5717 (6931960 G->A)
• • • • • • • • • • • • •I2a2a1b2a1b1b2 FGC17399/Y4926 (23549293 G->A)       
• • • • • • • • • • • • • •I2a2a1b2a1b1b2a S8104 (7432604 A->G) 
• • • • • • • • • • • •I2a2a1b2a1b1c Y4955 (15362162 G->A)
• • • • • • • • • • • • •I2a2a1b2a1b1c1 Y5695 (14574229 T->C)
• • • • • • • • • • • • • •I2a2a1b2a1b1c1a Y7263 (7900806 C->A)
• • • • • • • • • • • • • • •I2a2a1b2a1b1c1a1 Y7265 (9147689 T->C)
• • • • • • • • • • • • • •I2a2a1b2a1b1c1b FGC20004/Y5692 (18993826 A->T)
• • • • • • • • • • • • •I2a2a1b2a1b1c2 Y10659 (4616653 A->G)
• • • • • • • • • • •I2a2a1b2a1b2 L1425 (14491835 C->T)
• • • • • • • • • • • •I2a2a1b2a1b2a CTS5332.2/PF7472.2 (16212441 G->A)
• • • • • • • • • • • •I2a2a1b2a1b2b Y4769 (18201094 A->G)                                                     Germans
• • • • • • • • • • •I2a2a1b2a1b3 Y7426 (18830768 A->G)                                                      English
• • • • • • • • • • •I2a2a1b2a1b4 S243/Z63 (14401486 C->T)
• • • • • • • • • • •I2a2a1b2a1b5 M3268.2/PF3292.2 (8519704 G->A)    Germans
• • • • • • • • • • •I2a2a1b2a1b6 DF5.2/S191.2 (18393814 A->G)               Brits
• • • • • • • • • • •I2a2a1b2a1b7 F3406.2 (23119516 G->A)
• • • • • • • • • •I2a2a1b2a2 L1290 (14623983 T->C)                                                       n. Europeans
• • • • • • • • • •I2a2a1b2a3 Y7202 (2913976 G->A)                                    Germans
• • • • • • • •I2a2a1b2b L623 (16202490 A->T)
• • • • • • • •I2a2a1b2c CTS11871/S3673 (23326304 C->T)                                          Brits, Germans            
• • • • • • • •I2a2a1b2d Y5188 (7838639 G->A)                                           Maltese
• • • • • • •I2a2a1b3 S12606 (9879942 T->G)
• • • • • • • •I2a2a1b3a CTS12640/S4904/ZS21 (28652639 C->T)
• • • • •I2a2a2 S9403/SK1254 (6742730 T->C)  
• • • • • •I2a2a2a L1228 (15446045 G->C)                                                                      w. Europeans
• • • • • •I2a2a2b Y6099 (7527993 G->A)                                                 
• • • •I2a2b L38/S154 (15668070 A->G)
• • • • •I2a2b1 L533/S295 (2887198 G->C)                                                                     n.w. Europeans
• • • • •I2a2b2 S2606 (22527402 C->A)
• • • • • •I2a2b2a S2523 (14951410 C->T)
• • • • • • •I2a2b2a1 S24121 (22201497 C->A)
• • • • • • • •I2a2b2a1a S11558 (8491250 G->A)
• • • • • • • •I2a2b2a1b F780.2 (6384078 G->A) 
• • • • •I2a2b3 M8990/S3846 (7534645 A->C)
• • • • • •I2a2b3a S2488 (12733783 T->A)                                                                      English        
• • • • • •I2a2b3b S4556 (14124389 A->G)
• • • • •I2a2b4 P15.2/PF3112.2 (3244026 C->T) 
• •I2b L415/S435 (2888663 C->T) or L417/S332 (8426321 T->C)                                Germans, Italians
• •I2c L596/PF6907/S292 (14197631 G->A) or L597/S333 (18887888 T->A)
• • •I2c1 PF3892 (8487200 T->C)
• • • •I2c1a L1251 (2888598 C->T)                                                                                  Germans
• • • •I2c1b CTS4092 (15391894 G->A)
• • • • •I2c1b1 CTS7767.1 (17651573 C->A)
• • • • • •I2c1b1a PF6328 (21797244 C->A)
• • • • • • •I2c1b1a1 F2044 (15944600 T->A)                                                                Brits 
• • • •I2c1c S6685 (14185048 G->C)                                                                            
• • • • •I2c1c1 S6648 (14459289 T->A)  
• • • • • •I2c1c1a FGC18548 (7380574 A->G)                                                            Sardinians
• • • • • •I2c1c1b S6716 (16173282 G->C)    
• • • • • • •I2c1c1b1 S6622 (14264992 A->G)      
• • • • • • • •I2c1c1b1a S6595 (21430083 G->A)  
• • • • • • • • •I2c1c1b1a1 S6656 (17410728 G->C) 
• • • • • •I2c1c1c S9234 (6512608 A->G)        
• • •I2c2 PF3827 (22444389 T->A)
• • •I2c3 S6800 (16180130 G->A)

See also 
 Human Y-chromosome DNA haplogroups
 Haplogroup I (Y-DNA)
 Haplogroup I1 (Y-DNA)

Notes

References

External links 
YFull YTree of I2
FTDNA Y-DNA Haplotree of I
ISOGG 2019-2020 Y-DNA Haplogroup I and its Subclades

Relationship to haplogroups and subclades

I-M438
Human migration
Human population genetics
Genetic polymorphisms
Anthropomorphism